At Last... Bullamakanka: The Motion Picture is a 1983 Australian comedy film directed by Simon Heath and starring Steve Rackman, Gary Kliger, Alyson Best, Robert Baxter, and Angry Anderson, Adrian Bernotti The plot is about a small town visited by a government official. It is noticeable for the number of music acts that appear.

Premise
Rhino Jackson is seeking re-election as Mayor. He works with his son Taldo to hold a concert and win a horse race.

Claire and her father Walter own a property being taken over by Jackson.

Cast
Steve Rackman as Rhino Jackson
Gary Kliger as Waldo Jackson
Alyson Best as Clare Hampton
Robert Baxter as Senator
Angry Anderson as Senator's Aide
Bassia Carole as Sister Mary
Debbie Matts as Maureen
John Stone as Wally
Mark Hembrow as L D
Iain Gardiner as T M
Frank Thring as Television Producer
Molly Meldrum as a priest
John Farnham as a policeman
Derryn Hinch as a gangster henchman
Peter Russell Clarke as a gangster henchman
Gordon Elliott as a gangster
Adrian Bernotti as Rocko
Naomi Lisner formerly known as Naomi Lewis as Sam https://www.imdb.com/name/nm4541715/

Musical acts
Australian Crawl
Tony Catz Band
Jo Jo Zep and the Falcons
The Radiators
Rose Tattoo
The Skyhooks
The Sunnyboys
Wendy And The Rocketts
Uncanny X-Men

Production
According to David Stratton, "the film had a very troubled and lengthy production history which presumably accounts for the first two words tacked on to the title".

References

External links

Film page at Oz Movies
film information at Peter Malone
film information at BFI
film information at TCMDB

Australian comedy films
1983 films
1983 comedy films
1980s English-language films
1980s Australian films